Benjamin Ryan Bell is a New Zealand politician who is the mayor of the town of Gore in the South Island. In October 2022, Bell was elected as Gore's youngest mayor at the age of 23 years, defeating the incumbent Tracy Hicks. In mid November, the Gore District Council rejected Bell's request to hire a personal executive assistant named Shanna Crosbie. Bell subsequently went on leave after his fellow councillors submitted a requisition requesting the removal of deputy mayor Stewart MacDonell.

Early life and business career
Bell's mother is Rebecca Tayler and his biological father is Simon Bell. He grew up in Ōtaki and received his education at Paraparaumu College. When he was 12 years old, he invented a GPS-enabled wristband that allowed hospitals and visitors to trace the whereabouts of patients. In September 2016, he presented his wristband at the Medicine X conference organised by Stanford University in California. In November 2016, this invention won him the youth category of the Wellingtonian of the Year award.

During 2017, Bell worked at Ōtaki Countdown supermarket to save money for a 2018/19 northern hemisphere winter gap year in Canada, where he worked as a ski instructor despite having to learn to ski himself first. In his own words, "it was crazy... I knew the very basics." In 2019, Bell started to work at Horizons Regional Council as an environmental data analyst. In July 2021, he registered his own company—Random42 Limited—with himself as the sole director. His mother is a 49 per cent shareholder in that company. The company dealt with water-monitoring technology, portable wind turbines, and promoted Bell's wristband invention.

Mayoral career
During the 2022 Gore mayoral election, which was held as part of the 2022 New Zealand local elections, Bell positioned himself as the "change" candidate and campaigned on fixing rural roads, water infrastructure, and promoting recycling. During his campaign, Bell reached out to both young voters via social media and canvassed older voters through the Returned Services Association and other organisations. When the full local election results were released on 13 October 2022, Bell defeated the incumbent mayor Tracy Hicks by a narrow margin of 8 votes; winning 2,371 votes to Hicks' 2,363 votes. Hicks applied for a recount but a judge rejected his bid for a recount.

In mid November, several Gore councillors including Bret Highsted, Neville Phillips, Bronwyn Reid, and Richard McPhail boycotted Bell's retreat in Cromwell for elected members. The retreat was intended as a team-building exercise to introduce Bell's leadership strategy for the next three years of his mayoral term. Highsted criticised the decision to hold the retreat in Cromwell as disrespectful to the Gore community, ratepayers, businesses and the Mataura Licensing Trust. Deputy mayor Stewart MacDonell defended the retreat, stating that there had been "good, robust discussion" among the attendees. He also claimed that Bell had unsuccessfully tried to book facilities at Gore's Croydon Lounge for the retreat.  

On 22 November 2022, the Gore District Council rejected Bell's bid to hire an assistant. Councillor Bret Highsted opposed Bell's request for a personal assistant, describing it as a "vanity project". That same day, seven councillors including Richard McPhail, Reid, Highsted, Paul McPhail, Glenys Dickson, Phillips and Joe Stringer submitted a notice that they planned to meet on 15 December to vote on the removal of deputy mayor MacDonell and elect a new deputy. Following the mayoral election, Bell had designated MacDonell as deputy mayor, citing his "wealth of knowledge and experience in finances". On 24 November, the Gore District Council confirmed that Bell had gone on leave.

On 29 November, Gore District Council chief executive Stephen Parry estimated that Bell's proposed governance structure would cost the district council between NZ$140,000 and 300,000 per year. Bell's proposed governance structure would include 10 mana whenua representatives and several independent representatives. In late November, Bell returned following a three-day break and reaffirmed his commitment to his mayoral duties following a week of "challenging conversations". Following a workshop held on 1 December 2022 to discuss Bell's proposed governance structure, MacDonell resigned as deputy mayor.

In December 2022, Stuff reported that six Gore District councillors Highsted,  Reid, Dickson, Phillips, Paul and Richard McPhail had expressed concerns about Bell's management style and leadership to the Council's acting chief executive Parry on 19 November. In response, Parry submitted a letter to Bell claiming that his lack of engagement with staff and misrepresentation of issues was having a demoralising effect on Council staff. Key grievances raised by the councillors included Bell and Crosbie's planning of a staff retreat, a pōwhiri at the Council's swearing-in ceremony which was organised without staff input, and issuing their own press releases without consulting the Council's communications department. Bell had defended his actions, citing Section 41A of the Local Government Act 2002 and told the councillors to refer their grievances to Parry. Bell stated he was shocked to have received Parry's letter following his swearing in but later stated he was developing a "different working relationship with staff."

In February 2023, Bell's opponent Tracy Hick's social media manager Natasha Chadwick shared several private photos of Bell following the 2022 mayoral election with several media outlets including the Otago Daily Times. Chadwick defended her actions, stating that "what he [Bell] does socially is absolutely the people's business. Chadwick had suggested that Hicks share the photos during the 2022 mayoral election but Hicks had refused. In response, Bell dismissed rumors about his sexuality. When questioned by Radio New Zealand about an Instagram photo showing a male friend kissing him on the cheek, Bell stated that "the next generation would think nothing about it." Gore councillor John Gardyne described the 2022 Gore mayoral election as one of the "dirtiest campaigns" due to the significant antagonism between Hicks' and Bell's camps.

Notes and references

1999 births
Living people
Mayors of Gore
New Zealand businesspeople
21st-century New Zealand politicians
New Zealand inventors
People from Ōtaki, New Zealand